Mauro Esteban Aldave Benítez (born 7 November 1984) is a Uruguayan footballer currently playing as a striker for La Luz of the Uruguayan Segunda División Amateur in Uruguay.

External links
 
 

1984 births
Living people
Uruguayan footballers
Uruguayan expatriate footballers
Uruguayan Primera División players
Rocha F.C. players
The Strongest players
C.A. Bella Vista players
Sud América players
Expatriate footballers in Bolivia
Uruguayan expatriate sportspeople in Bolivia
Footballers from Montevideo
Association football forwards